Marie Elisabet Richardson (born 6 June 1959) is a Swedish stage, film, and television actress. She studied at the Teaterhögskolan i Stockholm from 1982 to 1985 and has been employed by The Royal Dramatic Theatre in Stockholm ever since. Richardson has been very active in films and television production as well as on stage for 30 years. She has two children with Jakob Eklund, also an actor.

In 2008 Richardson played Linda Jacobsson, the psychologically tormented wife of an obsessive violent politician (played by Reine Brynolfsson), in the Swedish mini-series The Regicide. The series was based on a novel written by Danish author Hanne Vibeke Holst. In December 2014, Richardson appeared in the Swedish television (SVT) series Blue Eyes and on stage at The Royal Dramatic Theatre in Stockholm in Mirja Unga's play Johanna, a modern take on the Joan of Arc theme. In 2017 and 2019 she was the lead character in the SVT series Before We Die.

Filmography

References

External links

 
 Marie Richardson website. List of films, tv and theatre work, links for tv and radio interviews, etc.

1959 births
Living people
People from Ljusdal Municipality
Swedish film actresses
Swedish stage actresses
Litteris et Artibus recipients